Kurt Mrkwicka (born 16 July 1937) is a retired Austrian diver. He competed in the 10 m platform and 3 m springboard at the 1960 and 1964 Summer Olympics with the best achievement of ninth place in the platform in 1960. He won the springboard event at the 1962 European Aquatics Championships.

After retiring from diving, in 1967 he established MR Film, a Vienna-based company that by 2013 produced over 500 films. He is also a member of supervisory panel of the therapeutic horse riding center Xenophon.

References

1937 births
Living people
Austrian male divers
Olympic divers of Austria
Divers at the 1960 Summer Olympics
Divers at the 1964 Summer Olympics